Nepean-Carleton was a provincial electoral district in eastern Ontario, Canada. It elected one member to the Legislative Assembly of Ontario from 1999 to 2014.

The riding was represented in the Ontario legislature by Progressive Conservative John Baird since it became a provincial riding in 1999 until he resigned in 2005 to run in the 2006 federal election. PC candidate Lisa MacLeod won the provincial by-election to fill the vacancy that was held on March 30, 2006.

Following the 2018 election, the district was dissolved into Nepean, Carleton, Orléans, and Kanata—Carleton.

History
The riding was created in 1999, to match its federal counterpart. It was made up of 62% of Nepean, 43% of Carleton and 11% of Ottawa–Rideau.

Members of Provincial Parliament

Election results

2007 electoral reform referendum

Sources

Provincial electoral districts of Ottawa